The 1888 Penn Quakers football team was an American football team that represented the University of Pennsylvania during the 1888 college football season. Halfback Tom Hulme was the team captain. The team played its home games at the University Athletic Grounds located at 37th and Spruce Streets.

Schedule

References

Penn
Penn Quakers football seasons
Penn Quakers football